Elections were held in the Australian state of Queensland on 22 May 1915 to elect the 72 members of the state's Legislative Assembly.

The election was the second for the Liberal government of Digby Denham, who had been premier since 7 February 1911. The opposition Labor Party, led by T. J. Ryan, had two previous Premiers — Anderson Dawson in 1899 and William Kidston in 1906 — but the former did not command a majority of parliamentary support, while the latter maintained it by splitting the Labor Party. Labor had never before held majority government.

The election was the first in Australia to be conducted using compulsory voting due to Denham's concern that Trade Unions were effectively mobilising the ALP vote; he felt that compulsory voting would ensure a more level playing field. However, it turned out that the change to compulsory voting was not enough to save Denham's premiership.

The election resulted in the defeat of the government, and Queensland's first majority Labor government. All except two members of the Ministry up for election, including Denham himself, lost their seats.

Key dates

Results

The election saw a landslide to Labor from the 1912 election.

|}

 335,195 electors were enrolled to vote at the election, but 8 seats (11.1% of the total) were uncontested—6 Labor seats representing 24,564 enrolled voters, one Liberal seat representing 3,999 voters, and one Farmers' Union seat representing 4,571 voters.

Seats changing party representation

This table lists changes in party representation at the 1915 election.

 Members listed in italics did not recontest their seats.

Aftermath
This was the start of a period of Labor hegemony over the Assembly which lasted until 1957; the only breach was the Moore ministry of the 1929–1932 period.

See also
 Candidates of the Queensland state election, 1915
 Members of the Queensland Legislative Assembly, 1912–1915
 Members of the Queensland Legislative Assembly, 1915–1918
 Denham Ministry
 Ryan Ministry

References

Elections in Queensland
1915 elections in Australia
1910s in Queensland
May 1915 events